Under the Driftwood Tree (also known as UDWT) are a Cardiff-based band founded in Wales by Kitt Stoodley in 2008. Their music is described as 'surfer folk' and is based on vocal harmonies and unusual instruments, including ukulele, didgeridoo, djembe, cajon and accordion as well as acoustic guitars and bass.

History
The band originated as an acoustic guitar duo consisting of Chris Stoodley and Dylan Thomas (of Pwllheli) after the pair had met whilst performing at "Open Mic at the Gate" in Cardiff during the Autumn of 2008. The band name is an adaptation of "The Milk Wood" by Thomas's namesake. Stoodley and Thomas recorded their first song together in December 2008 entitled 'Gone For A Week'.
In February 2009 Thomas left the group to pursue other interests.

Stoodley met the other members of UDWT through shared interests in music and surfing. Alex Perry on lead guitar and Robbie Price on vocals and rhythm guitar, from Pembroke, joined Cardiff based Kitt Stoodley on vocals and Ukulele and Kathryn Shanahan from Tipperary in Ireland on vocals and djembe drum as a four-piece surf style folk band in February 2009.  They began playing regularly at popular live music venues in Cardiff and were the Welsh winners of the Surface Unsigned Festival in 2009, shortlisted from 30,000 applicants and performed at IndigO2 in The O2 in London. In 2010 they were joined by Samuel Lloyd Griffiths on Bass and performed at The Eden Sessions with Jack Johnson in Cornwall on 26 June 2010.
 
In 2013, Shanahan left the band and returned to Ireland.

In 2019 Chris changed name to his stage name Kitt Stoodley during his campaign to promote his solo material and his own record label "Amped In'Sain". The year also saw the announcement on the bands Facebook page that Under The Driftwood Tree had reformed and will play a live come back show at the "10 Feet Tall" music bar in Cardiff in September 2019 . Whether this return is just a re-union or a permanent one and if the band will finally release any new material is still yet to be announced. In July 2019 the shelved debut album was finally released on Bandcamp entitled "If Only If: The Collection. Following the release of the debut album on the 28th of August 2019 a collection of unreleased material and covers saw release on the compilation album "Covers and Left Overs" on Bandcamp.

Band members
Current members
 Kitt Stoodley - Vocals, Ukulele, Guitar, Accordion, Didgeridoo, Djembe, Percussion

Former members
 Robbie Price - Vocals, Guitar, Accordion
 Alex Perry - Lead Guitar
 Samuel Lloyd Griffiths - Bass
 Ian Jenkins - Percussion
 Dylan Thomas - Bass, Vocals, Guitar
 Kathryn Shanahan - Vocals, Percussion, Accordion

Television and radio
In May 2010 Under the Driftwood Tree played a live session on the BBC Radio Wales Evening Show. This has since led to them being invited to play the UK Number 1 live each Monday on Radio Cardiff, as well as performing on RTÉ Radio 1.

Although they did not get through to the final their appearance on the Sky talent show Must Be The Music led to Fearne Cotton inviting them to perform live on her radio show on 14 December 2010.

Singles
 "If Only If" (2011)

Albums and E.P's
BBC Introduces: Under The Driftwood Tree E.P. (2010) (released in limited numbers) 
If Only If: The Collection (2019) (Release of the shelved debut album from 2012)
Covers and Left Overs (2019) (Compilation album featuring a collection of covers, demos and unreleased material)

Music Videos
 "Under The Thumb" (2010) Directed and edited by Claire Kern. From If Only If: The Collection.  
 "Road Runner" (2012) Directed Unknown. From If Only If: The Collection.  
 "If Only If" (2019) Directed by Various, Edited by Toomas Probert. From If Only If: The Collection.
 "Noah's Ark" (2019) Directed and edited by Toomas Probert. From Covers and Left Overs.

References

External links
 Photo gallery of UTDT on BBC 'Introducing Artists' web site
 Under The Driftwood Tree perform If Only If live at Maida Vale for BBC (video)
 Facebook page
 Bandcamp
 website

Musical groups from Cardiff